The 2019–20 UTEP Miners basketball team represents the University of Texas at El Paso during the 2019–20 NCAA Division I men's basketball season. The Miners, led by second-year head coach Rodney Terry, play their home games at the Don Haskins Center as members of Conference USA. UTEP averaged 5,311 fans per game.

Previous season
The Miners finished the 2018–19 season 8–21, 3–15 in C-USA play to finish in last place. They failed to qualify for the C-USA Tournament.

Roster

Schedule and results

|-
!colspan=9 style=|Non-conference regular season

|-
!colspan=9 style=| Conference USA regular season

|-
!colspan=12 style=| Conference USA tournament

|-

Source

References

UTSA Roadrunners men's basketball seasons
UTEP Miners men's basketball team
UTEP Miners men's basketball team
UTEP Miners men's basketball seasons
UTEP